Damurhuda is an upazila of Chuadanga District in the Division of Khulna, Bangladesh.

Geography
It has 37,279 households and a total area of 308.11 km2.

Dumurhuda Upazila is bounded by Meherpur Sadar Upazila, in Meherpur District, and Alamdanga Upazila in Chuadanga District, on the north, Chuadanga Sadar Upazila on the east, Krishnaganj CD Block, in Nadia District, West Bengal, India, on the south and Chapra CD Block, in Nadia district, on the west.

Demographics
According to 2011 Bangladesh census, Damurhuda had a population of 289,577. Males constituted 50.10% of the population and females 49.84. Muslims formed 75.81% of the population, Christians 23.48% Hindus 2.58%, and others 0.116%. Damurhuda had a literacy rate of 44.15% for the population 7 years and above.

According to the 1991 Bangladesh census, Damurhuda had a population of 213,291. Males constituted 51.69% of the population, and females 48.31%. The population aged 18 or over was 107,245. Damurhuda has an average literacy rate of 25.6% (7+ years), compared to the national average of 32.4%.

Administration
Damurhuda Upazila is divided into Darshana Municipality and seven union parishads: Damurhuda, Hawli, Juranpur, Karpashdanga, Kurulgachhi, Natipota, and Perkrishnopur Madna. The union parishads are subdivided into 78 mauzas and 102 villages.

Darshana Municipality is subdivided into 9 wards and 21 mahallas.

See also
Upazilas of Bangladesh
Districts of Bangladesh
Divisions of Bangladesh

References

Upazilas of Chuadanga District
Chuadanga District
Khulna Division